The 1945 British victory parade in Berlin was a military parade held by the British Army on 21 July 1945 in Berlin, the capital of the then-defeated Nazi Germany. It took place on Straße des 17. Juni, which is east of Brandenburg Gate. The parade took place a month after the Moscow Victory Parade of 1945 and over two weeks before the Berlin Victory Parade. It was attended by Winston Churchill in his position as Prime Minister of the United Kingdom and Field Marshal Bernard Montgomery, Commander-in-Chief of the 21st Army Group. Clement Attlee, who was Leader of the Labour Party at the time and succeeded Churchill 5 days later also attended. It occurred during the Potsdam Conference which had begun 4 days earlier with the participation of Churchill, Soviet General Secretary Joseph Stalin and President Harry S. Truman.

10,000 troops of the British Army took part in the event. Attendees also included Henry H. Arnold and George Marshall, both five-star Generals.

See also
 Moscow Victory Parade of 1945
 London Victory Celebrations of 1946
 New York City Victory Parade of 1946

References

External link

Aftermath of World War II in Germany
1945 in Germany
Victory parades
Germany–United Kingdom relations
1945 in military history
1940s in Berlin
July 1945 events in Europe
Military parades in Germany
British forces in Germany